Mohamed Muiz is a Maldives politician who is the current mayor of Malé city council of the Maldives. He was the previous minister of Housing and Environment, in the administration of Mohammed Waheed Hassan and later served as the Housing Minister of President Abdulla Yameen.

References 

Living people
People from Malé
Maldivian politicians
Year of birth missing (living people)